Stanton Thomas Barrett (born December 1, 1972) is an American professional stock car racing driver and Hollywood stuntman who last competed part-time in the NASCAR Xfinity Series, driving the No. 47 Chevrolet Camaro for Mike Harmon Racing, and part-time in the ARCA Menards Series, driving the No. 11 Toyota Camry for Fast Track Racing. 

The son of former stuntman Stan Barrett, he began NASCAR racing in the early 1990s, starting with the Busch Series in 1992. Seven years later, he started racing in the Cup Series, making his series debut with Donlavey Racing. Barrett has since run part-time across NASCAR's top three series, sometimes as an owner/driver. Barrett has also competed in the IndyCar Series, running four races in 2009 for Team 3G.

Racing career

NASCAR

Early career
Barrett first started racing when he was 16 in karts, winning 21 races in 28 starts. In 1992, Barrett started racing in NASCAR's Busch North Series, his debut coming at the Big Apple Food Stores 200 at Oxford Plains Speedway at the age of 19; Barrett finished 21st, eleven laps behind race winner Joe Bessey. He also ran in the NASCAR Dash Series, funding the car with money earned as a stuntman for the movie Freejack. Despite running as high as second in points, crashes relegated his final finish in the standings to sixth.

Xfinity Series

During the 1992 season, Busch Series driver Clifford Allison was killed in a crash at Michigan International Speedway, leaving a ride open for Barrett. He made a few limited starts with his own team in the series for several years, and in his sixth career start, finished 5th at the spring race at Atlanta in 1996.

For the following two years, he drove for Pro-Tech Motorsports and NorthStar Motorsports, recording an eighth-place finish at Bristol with the latter. In 1999, Barrett ran a partial Busch slate with Galaxy Motorsports, but left the team in the middle of the season when management suggested he would be replaced for an upcoming race at Watkins Glen International.

In 2003, he signed with Roush Racing and finished in the top-ten four times, but Odoban ended its sponsorship after 15 races, forcing the team to close down. He returned to driving his own car for the remainder of the season, but only finished one race at Lowe's Motor Speedway. Barrett continued driving for his team in 2004, and joined DCT Motorsports for the 2005 season, scoring his only top ten of the season at New Hampshire Motor Speedway. In 2006, Barrett ran a variety of Busch events for MacDonald Motorsports and McGill Motorsports, and ran some races for Stanton Barrett Motorsports in 2007. For the 2008 NAPA Auto Parts 200 at Circuit Gilles Villeneuve, Barrett fielded a ride for himself and his father Stan. In a race marred by rain, the two finished 25th and 39th, respectively.

The following year, Barrett joined Rick Ware Racing.

Cup Series

In 1999, Barrett announced his intention to compete part-time in the Winston Cup Series, running for Rookie of the Year honors with PBH Motorsports, with plans to run full-time in 2000. However, he failed to qualify for the Daytona 500. Barrett worked out a late-season deal with Donleavy Racing to make eight race attempts in 1999. in 2000, he attempted the Budweiser Shootout qualifier for drivers who ran the fastest in 2nd-round-qualifying in 1999, but crashed on the first lap with Jimmy Spencer, Rick Mast and Kenny Wallace. He joined the Tri-Star Motorsports team for the 2000 Daytona 500.

In 2004, Barrett returned to Nextel Cup driving the No. 94 Chevrolet for W.W. Motorsports. He failed to finish a race for the team and was replaced by Derrike Cope. Later in the year, he joined Means-Jenkins Motorsports to drive the No. 92 for the race at Dover, but failed to qualify.

In 2005, Barrett began the season with Front Row Motorsports but was later let go by the team; he then ran Cup races under his own Stanton Barrett Motorsports team. The following year, he ran a partial sschedule between SBM and Rick Ware Racing, failing to qualify for a number of races. He reunited with Ware for an attempt at the 2007 Daytona 500. Barrett attempted a limited schedule of 2008 races with SKI Motorsports.

Barrett was initially scheduled to make his Cup Series return in 2017 with Rick Ware Racing, but did not make a start. A year later, he rejoined Ware for the 2018 Bank of America Roval 400 at Charlotte. In 2019, he returned to the series for his first superspeedway Cup start in the 2019 GEICO 500 at Talladega.

In August 2020, Barrett joined Spire Motorsports for the Go Bowling 235 on the Daytona road course.

Camping World Truck Series
In 2015, Barrett made his Camping World Truck Series debut for his team at Talladega Superspeedway, driving the No. 91 Chevrolet Silverado. The race marked his first at Talladega since 2005. After qualifying 21st, Barrett was collected in The Big One on lap 86, hitting the wall and Matt Crafton. Barrett was credited with a 29th-place finish.

IndyCar Series
In 2009, Barrett expressed an interest in running IndyCar Series races after the series merged with Champ Car. At the Nationwide Series race at Kansas Speedway, he officially announced that he had joined Team 3G full-time to drive the No. 98, while also running 19–21 races in the Nationwide Series. In his IndyCar debut at the Honda Grand Prix of St. Petersburg, Barrett qualified 21st and finished 12th, four laps behind race winner Ryan Briscoe. Barrett struggled during the season, including failing to qualify for the Indianapolis 500 and missing the ABC Supply Company A.J. Foyt 225 due to a crash in practice, and was eventually replaced by Jaques Lazier. Barrett returned to the series later in the year at Twin Ring Motegi, where he finished 19th.

Other racing
In 1996, Barrett made an IMSA GT Championship start at Road Atlanta in the Grand Prix of Atlanta, driving a Chevrolet Camaro for Shaver Motorsports with Jack Willes as a co-driver. After qualifying 14th, the team finished 13th overall and fifth in the GTS-1 class. He returned to sports car racing in 2017, competing in the Trans-Am Series's TA class in the No. 33 Chevrolet.

In 2006, Barrett and nine other NASCAR drivers competed in the Geoff Bodine Bobsled Challenge, a charity race for the Bo-Dyn Bobsled Project; Barrett finished third overall, the only driver to finish in the top three in the event's two races.

In July 2021, Barrett tested with the Stadium Super Trucks ahead of his series debut the following month at the Music City Grand Prix.

Film career
 
Barrett has performed as a stuntman in skiing, motocross and snowmobile racing. He has worked in nearly 200 motion pictures and television series and commercials. He has worked additionally in stunt doubling and stunt coordinating for many Hollywood actors in films such as: The Dukes of Hazzard, Spider-Man 1, 2 and 3, Jurassic Park 2 and 3, Rat Race, Blade, Batman, The Nutty Professor, Volcano, Jumanji, Fastlane,  Mr. & Mrs. Smith and 127 Hours.

In 2015, Barrett directed his first movie, a direct-to-video film titled Navy Seals vs. Zombies.

Family
His father, Stan Barrett who was also a Hollywood stuntman raced in 19 Winston Cup Series races between 1980 and 1990, posting two top-ten finishes, along with running in the Nationwide Series in 2008. He is the godson of Paul Newman, and the grandson of Dave and Roma McCoy, the founders of Mammoth Mountain Ski Area.

His mother is Penny McCoy, a former World Cup alpine ski racer. At age 16, she won the bronze medal in the women's slalom at the 1966 World Championships in Portillo, Chile. His brother David Barrett is a television director and producer.

Motorsports career results

NASCAR
(key) (Bold – Pole position awarded by qualifying time. Italics – Pole position earned by points standings or practice time. * – Most laps led.)

Cup Series

Daytona 500

Xfinity Series

Camping World Truck Series

 Season still in progress 
 Ineligible for series points

ARCA Menards Series
(key) (Bold – Pole position awarded by qualifying time. Italics – Pole position earned by points standings or practice time. * – Most laps led.)

American open-wheel racing
(key) (Races in bold indicate pole position)

IndyCar Series

Stadium Super Trucks
(key) (Bold – Pole position. Italics – Fastest qualifier. * – Most laps led.)

References

External links

 
 
 
 

Living people
1972 births
People from Bishop, California
American stunt performers
Racing drivers from California
NASCAR drivers
IndyCar Series drivers
NASCAR team owners
IndyCar Series team owners
Trans-Am Series drivers
Film directors from California
ARCA Menards Series drivers
Stadium Super Trucks drivers
RFK Racing drivers